Ella à Nice is a 1982 album recorded live in 1971 by American jazz singer Ella Fitzgerald, accompanied by a jazz trio led by the pianist Tommy Flanagan. This recording remained unreleased until the early 1980s.

Track listing
For the 1982 LP on Pablo Records; Pablo 2308 234; Re-issued by Pablo Records in 1990 on CD; OJC20 442-2

Side One:
 "Night and Day" (Cole Porter) – 6:43
The Many Faces of Cole Porter: "Get Out of Town"/"You'd Be So Easy to Love", "You Do Something to Me" (Porter) – 5:22
The Ballad Medley: "Body and Soul", "The Man I Love", "I Loves You Porgy" (Frank Eyton, Johnny Green, Edward Heyman, Robert Sour)/(George Gershwin, Ira Gershwin)/(G. Gershwin, I. Gershwin) – 4:42
The Bossa Scene: "The Girl from Ipanema"/"Fly Me to the Moon"/"O Nosso Amor"/"Madalena"/"Agua de Beber" (Antonio Carlos Jobim, Norman Gimbel, Vinícius de Moraes)/(Bart Howard)/(Jobim, de Moraes)/(Jobim, Ronaldo Monteiro de Souza)/(Jobim, de Moraes) – 5:35
 "Summertime" (G. Gershwin, I. Gershwin, DuBose Heyward) – 2:36
Side Two: 
 "They Can't Take That Away from Me" (G. Gershwin, I. Gershwin) – 4:14
Aspects of Duke: "Mood Indigo"/"Do Nothing till You Hear from Me"/"It Don't Mean a Thing (If It Ain't Got That Swing)" (Barney Bigard, Duke Ellington, Irving Mills)/(Ellington, Bob Russell)/(Ellington, Mills) – 7:16
 "Something" (George Harrison) – 3:33
 "St. Louis Blues" (W.C. Handy) – 2:59
 "Close to You" (Burt Bacharach, Hal David) –2:45
 "Put a Little Love in Your Heart" (Jackie DeShannon, Jimmy Holiday, Randy Myers) – 4:29

Personnel
Recorded July 21, 1971, in Nice, France:

 Ella Fitzgerald - vocals
 Tommy Flanagan - piano
 Frank DeLaRosa - double bass
 Ed Thigpen - drums

References

Ella Fitzgerald live albums
Albums produced by Norman Granz
1982 live albums
Pablo Records live albums
1971 live albums